The 1984–85 Scottish Inter-District Championship was a rugby union competition for Scotland's district teams.

This season saw the 32nd Scottish Inter-District Championship.

South won the competition with 4 wins.

1984-85 League Table

Results

Round 1

North and Midlands: 

Edinburgh District:

Glasgow District: 

South of Scotland:

Round 2

Anglo-Scots: 

North and Midlands:

South of Scotland: 

Edinburgh District:

Round 3

Edinburgh District: 

Anglo-Scots:

Glasgow District: 

North and Midlands:

Round 4

Anglo-Scots: 

Glasgow District: 

North and Midlands: 

South of Scotland:

Round 5

Edinburgh District: 

Glasgow District: 

South of Scotland: 

Anglo-Scots:

Matches outwith the Championship

Other Scottish matches

Rest of the West: 

Glasgow District: 

Midlands District: 

North of Scotland District:

Junior matches

South Junior League Champions: 

South Junior League Select:

Trial matches

Blues: 

Reds:

English matches

South: 

Durham County:

Irish matches

South: 

Leinster:

International matches

South of Scotland District: 

Australia: 

Glasgow District: 

Australia:

References

1984–85 in Scottish rugby union
1984–85